The Japan Association of Translators (JAT) is the largest professional association of practicing translators and interpreters in Japan, with approximately 800 members. The association was founded in 1985.

Membership is open to any individual with an interest in translation and interpreting between English and Japanese as a profession or as a scholarly pursuit. Members include, but are not limited to, translators, interpreters, teachers, and project managers.

JAT is affiliated with the International Federation of Translators (FIT). Its home office is in Tokyo, Japan.

See also
 List of Japanese interpreting and translation associations
 International Japanese-English Translation Conference

External links
 Japan Association of Translators

References

Professional associations based in Japan
Translation organizations